Ova is the plural form of ovum, the female sex cell or gamete.

Ova or OVA may also refer to:

Places
 Ova, Kaş, a village in the Antalya Province, Turkey
 Ova, Kentucky, an unincorporated community

Organizations
 Office for Veterans' Affairs, part of the UK Government
 Open Virtualization Alliance, consortium promoting the use of free and open-source software

Science and technology
 Ovalbumin (OVA), a protein found in egg whites
 .ova, filename extension in Open Virtualization Format
 Original video animation, anime films released directly to video

Other uses
 -ova, a feminine surname suffix in Eastern Slavic naming customs